Sylvia Jean Wilkinson (born 1940) is an American author.

She was born in Durham, North Carolina in the United States and graduated from Woman's College, now the University of North Carolina at Greensboro, in 1962. She received her master's degree from Hollins College (now Hollins University)  in 1963 and studied at Stanford University under a Wallace Stegner Creative Writing Fellowship 1965-66.

Wilkinson taught at various institutions including the Universities of North Carolina at Asheville and Chapel Hill, the College of William & Mary, Sweet Briar College, Hollins University, Washington University in St. Louis and the University of Wisconsin–Milwaukee. She is a teaching scholar with the National Faculty.   She  received a number of literary awards including the Sir Walter Raleigh Award twice—in 1968 for A Killing Frost, and again in 1978 for Shadow of the Mountain, a Eugene Saxton Grant, a National Endowment for the Arts Fellowship, a Guggenheim Fellowship in 1977, the UNC - Greensboro Alumnae Service Award, and a Mademoiselle Merit Award for Literature.  She has published 27 books: 7 novels for adults, 4 adult non fiction works (3 on auto racing, one on education) and 16 juveniles with automotive themes.  

She was a Motorsports Correspondent for Autoweek and is currently a World Book Encyclopedia contributor on auto racing.  She was an auto racing timer and scorer for many years for numerous drivers including Paul Newman, Al Unser Sr., Bobby Rahal and Keke Rosberg.

In 2012, her account of the 2.5 Trans-Am seasons featuring the Brock Racing team with driver John Morton during 1971 - 1972, "The Stainless Steel Carrot", originally published in 1973 by Houghton Mifflin, was reissued by Brown Fox Books with an update on the participants with all royalties going to animal rescue and wildlife groups.  In December 2014, her seventh novel: Big Cactus was published by Owl Canyon Press in Boulder, Colorado. In November of 2018, a non-fiction work on race driver John Paul Jr. and his battle with Huntington's Disease entitled "50/50" was published by High Desert Press with all profits going to Paul Jr.'s research fund at UCLA.  An updated version of "Dirt Tracks to Glory" was published by Racemaker Press, Boston, in April, 2022.

Bibliography

Novels:

Moss on the North Side (Houghton Mifflin, 1966, Rupert Hart Davis, London, 1967), Wie Der Regen Im Wald, (Limes Verlag, Wiesbaden, 1969)
A Killing Frost (Houghton Mifflin, 1967), Wie Spates Licht Auf Vogelfedern, (Limes Verlag, Wiesbaden, 1967)
Cale (Houghton Mifflin, 1970)
Shadow of the Mountain (Houghton Mifflin, 1977)
Bone of My Bones (Putnam, 1982)
On the 7th Day, God Created the Chevrolet (Algonquin Books, 1993)
Big Cactus (Owl Canyon Press, 2014)

Nonfiction:

Change: A Handbook for the Teaching of English and Social Studies in the Secondary Schools (LINC Press, 1971)
The Stainless Steel Carrot: An Auto Racing Odyssey (Houghton Mifflin, 1973) (Brown Fox Books, 2012)
Dirt Tracks to Glory: The Early Days of Stock Car Racing as Told by the Participants (Algonquin Books, 1983) (Racemaker Press, 2022)
 "50/50, The Story of Champion Race Car Driver John Paul Jr. and his Battle with Huntington's Disease" (High    Desert Press, 2018)

Juvenile Nonfiction:

Can-Am (Children's Press, 1981)
Endurance Racing (Children's Press, 1981)
Formula Atlantic (Children's Press, 1981)
Formula One (Children's Press, 1981)
Sprint Cars (Children's Press, 1981)
Stock Cars (Children's Press, 1981)
Super Vee (Children's Press, 1981)

Champ Cars (Children's Press, 1982)
The True Book of Automobiles (Children's Press, 1982)
Trans-Am (Children's Press, 1983)
Kart Racing (Children's Press, 1985)
I Can Be a Race Car Driver (Children's Press, 1986)

Young Adult Mysteries by "Eric Speed" 

 "Mexicali 1000"(Grosset and Dunlap, 1975)
 "Road Race of Champions"(Grosset and Dunlap, 1975)
 "GT Challenge" (Grosset and Dunlap, 1976)
 "Midnight Rally" (Grosset and Dunlap, 1978)

References
Finding Aid for the Sylvia Wilkinson Papers The University of North Carolina at Greensboro

External links

1940 births
Living people
University of North Carolina at Greensboro alumni
Hollins University alumni
Stanford University alumni
University of North Carolina at Asheville faculty
University of North Carolina at Chapel Hill faculty
Sweet Briar College faculty
University of Wisconsin–Milwaukee faculty
College of William & Mary faculty
Washington University in St. Louis faculty